Upper Talley Lake and Lower Talley Lake (Welsh:  and ) are two small lakes immediately north of the village of Talley,  north of Llandeilo in Carmarthenshire,  Wales. They are protected as a Site of Special Scientific Interest (SSSI).

Morphology
The lakes occupy a glacial hollow that formed during the last ice age, the intervening ground being formed from hummocky glacial deposits.

History
The earthworks of a Norman motte-and-bailey castle occupy the neck of land between the two lakes. The surrounding bailey would have enclosed the lord's hall and related buildings. The castle probably fell out of use when Talley Abbey was established.

Talley Abbey is immediately to the south of the upper lake, and was founded between 1184 and 1189. The monks used the lakes for farming fish. The abbey was dissolved in the sixteenth century and is now a ruin.

Mythology
There is a tradition that a drowned town lies under the lakes.

Natural history
The lower lake is surrounded by alder and willow woods and is not easily accessible. It is used by overwintering wildfowl. The upper lake is more open and can be seen from the B4302 road.

Great crested grebes and mute swans regularly breed on the reserve. Regular visiting birds include tufted ducks, pochards, goldeneye ducks and goosanders.

Water plants in the lower lake include yellow and white water lilies and water crowfoot. This is the most southerly British location of the water sedge.

Invertebrates in the reserve include water beetles and the leaf beetle Donacia obscura. Dragonflies are commonly seen including the emperor dragonfly.

See also
List of Sites of Special Scientific Interest in Carmarthen & Dinefwr

References

Lakes of Carmarthenshire
Sites of Special Scientific Interest in Carmarthen & Dinefwr